Mark Davis (born 4 July 1964) is an English professional golfer.

Davis was born in Brentwood, Essex. In 1984, he won the Brabazon Trophy and represented England in the European Youths' Team Championship. He turned professional two years later.

Davis finished in the top hundred on the European Tour Order of Merit eight times, with a best of 31st in 1994, and twice won the Austrian Open (1991 and 1994). From 1999 onwards he was dogged by injuries, and his last full season on the tour was 2002.

Amateur wins (2)
1984 Brabazon Trophy
1985 Golf Illustrated Gold Vase

Professional wins (3)

European Tour wins (2)

European Senior Tour wins (1)

Results in major championships

Note: Davis only played in The Open Championship.

CUT = missed the half-way cut
"T" = tied

Team appearances
Amateur
European Youths' Team Championship (representing England): 1984

References

External links

English male golfers
European Tour golfers
European Senior Tour golfers
People from Brentwood, Essex
1964 births
Living people